Eskimo (often considered a pejorative), is an exonym for the Inuit and Yupik indigenous peoples who have traditionally inhabited the northern circumpolar region from eastern Siberia (Russia), across Alaska (United States), Canada, and Greenland.

Eskimo may also refer to:

Dogs
 American Eskimo Dog
 Canadian Eskimo Dog
 One of various breeds of huskies

Food
 Eskimo (ice cream), a national Nicaraguan ice cream chain
 Eskimo Mints, a type of breath mint produced by Oatfield
 Edy's Pie a brand of ice cream confections in the USA formerly known as Eskimo Pie

Geography
 Eskimo Hill, a mountain in Alaska, U.S.
 Eskimo Pass, a pass on Baffin Island, Nunavut, Canada
 Eskimo Point, a promontory in Antarctica
 Arviat, a community in Nunavut, Canada, formerly called Eskimo Point
 Eskimo Point and Eskimo Island, located near Churchill, Manitoba, Canada

Music
 Eskimo (DJ) (born 1985), psytrance DJ and producer
 Eskimo (album), a 1979 album by The Residents
 "Eskimo", a song by Corky and the Juice Pigs
 "Eskimo", a song by Damien Rice from his 2003 album O
 "Eskimo", a song by the Red Hot Chili Peppers, released as a b-side to "Fortune Faded"
 Eskimo (grime beat), an instrumental grime beat by MC Wiley

Screen
 Eskimo (1930 film), a Norwegian film directed by George Schnéevoigt
 Eskimo (1933 film), an Oscar-winning film by Irving Thalberg

Sports
 Abitibi Eskimos, a former name of the amateur ice hockey team the Timmins Rock
 Edmonton Eskimos, a former name of the Canadian Football League team the Edmonton Elks
 Duluth Eskimos, a former National Football league team

Other
 Eskimo (appliances), a Greek domestic appliance company
 Eskimo curlew, a rare species of curlew
 Eskimo kinship, a type of kinship system
 Eskimo kiss, the act of pressing the tip of one's nose against another's nose.
 Eskimo Nebula, a cloud of gas 3000 light-years from earth
 Esky, an Australian term for a portable cooler
 Paul Clark (poker player) (1947–2015), nicknamed Eskimo
 Esquimaux (HBC vessel), a Hudson's Bay Company vessel
 Eskimo (HBC vessel), a Hudson's Bay Company vessel

See also

 Eskimo Joe (disambiguation)
 
 Gabby's World, a band formerly known as Eskimeaux
 Eskmo, an American electronic music producer and composer
 Ezkimo, a Finnish hip hop musician
 Esquimalt (disambiguation)